Calamus is a genus of porgies in the family Sparidae. It contains thirteen described species.

Species 
Calamus arctifrons, Grass porgy
Calamus bajonado, Jolthead porgy
Calamus brachysomus, Pacific porgy
Calamus calamus, Saucereye porgy
Calamus campechanus, Campeche porgy
Calamus cervigoni, Spotfin porgy
Calamus leucosteus, Whitebone porgy
Calamus mu, Flathead porgy
Calamus nodosus, Knobbed porgy
Calamus penna, Sheepshead porgy
Calamus pennatula, Pluma porgy
Calamus proridens, Littlehead porgy
Calamus taurinus, Galapagos porgy

References

 

 
Extant Rupelian first appearances
Marine fish genera
Taxa named by William John Swainson
Rupelian genus first appearances